Regidor Lim de la Rosa (November 12, 1916 – November 26, 1986), professionally known as Rogelio de la Rosa, was one of the most popular Filipino matinee idols of the 20th century. He is also remembered for his statesmanship, in particular his accomplishments as a diplomat.  Elected to the Philippine Senate from 1957 to 1963, he was the first Filipino film actor to parlay his fame into a substantial political career, paving the way for other future Filipino entertainers-turned-politicians such as Senators Eddie Ilarde, Ramon Revilla Sr., Tito Sotto, Ramon "Bong" Revilla Jr., Jinggoy Estrada, Lito Lapid, Freddie Webb, Robin Padilla, Raffy Tulfo and President Joseph Estrada.

Early life
He was born in Lubao, Pampanga, the son of an arnis champion. Lubao was also the hometown of Diosdado Macapagal, six years his senior and a future political opponent and brother-in-law. Macapagal's first wife, Purita, was de la Rosa's sister. He has Spanish and Chinese ancestry.

While in high school, de la Rosa, along with Macapagal would regularly perform in zarzuelas as a villain.

As a teenager, he was cast by his uncle, a film director, in a starring role in the silent film Ligaw na Bulaklak opposite Rosa del Rosario. The film's director, José Nepomuceno, gave him the screen name "Rogelio de la Rosa". However, the young actor did not then engage in a regular film career, opting instead to attend college at the Far Eastern University in Manila. An excellent collegiate athlete and debater in the years from 1932-34. In 1933, de la Rosa won the Claro M. Recto Gold Medal in a national oratorical contest.

Film stardom
De la Rosa burst into stardom in the late 1930s after being frequently cast in dramas as a romantic idol opposite such actresses as Rosa del Rosario, Carmen Rosales, Emma Alegre, and Paraluman. Rosales proved to be his most durable onscreen partner, and their "love team" is said to be among the most successful in the history of Philippine movies.

When the Philippine film industry was held to a standstill during the Japanese occupation from 1941 to 1945, de la Rosa remained in the public eye as a bodabil performer at the Life Theater in Manila. After the war, he resumed his film career and proved more popular than ever. emerged as a star, perhaps the most popular film actor of the first decade of the post-war. He formed his own film production company, RDR Productions, and starred as well in productions of LVN Pictures, often with Rosales.

By 1948, he was the highest paid Filipino movie actor. His success in films remained steady in the 1950s. He had been cast as the first Filipino actor, under the name of Ramon Delgado, to star in an American-produced movie, The Sword of Avenger. His 1955 role in Higit sa Lahat with Emma Alegre earned him the 'Best Actor' trophy at the 1956 FAMAS awards, as well as the Best Actor Award at the 1956 Southeast Asian Film Festival in Hong Kong.

Senator and presidential candidate
In the 1957 general elections, de la Rosa ran and won a seat in the Philippine Senate under the banner of the Liberal Party. He served for one 6-year term spanning the 4th and 5th Congress. As a Senator, he was active in issues of particular concern within his home province of Pampanga such as fisheries and agriculture, emerging as a strong advocate for nationalization of those industries. Appropriately, de la Rosa was also interested in issues relating to the Filipino film industry, co-authoring a bill that would lead to the establishment of a Board of Censors.

After three years in the Senate, de la Rosa decided to run for the presidency as an independent candidate. His residual popularity as a film star, as well as the unpopularity of incumbent re-electionist Nacionalista Carlos P. Garcia made him a credible candidate. The other major candidate in the race was then-Vice President Macapagal of the Liberal Party, his former brother-in-law.

Shortly before election day, de la Rosa withdrew from the election. According to his official Senate biography, de la Rosa was concerned about the strength of what he perceived as the corrupt political machinery of President Garcia, and was ultimately convinced that his withdrawal from the race was the only way to ensure Garcia's defeat. Whatever the motivation, de la Rosa's gambit proved successful, and Macapagal was easily elected over Garcia. Returning to the Liberal Party, de la Rosa was defeated for re-election to the Senate in the 1963 general elections. He would never again be elected to public office.

Diplomat and later years
De la Rosa remained in public service as an acclaimed diplomat. In 1965, he was appointed Philippine Ambassador to Cambodia, an important designation considering that country's proximity to the Philippines. During the administration of Ferdinand Marcos, de la Rosa was also named as Philippine Ambassador to the Netherlands, and to the Soviet bloc countries of Poland, Bulgaria and Czechoslovakia. He was duly admired for his savvy in foreign affairs and language proficiency. He also used his position to promote Filipino art and culture and to assist Filipino artists performing abroad. His last diplomatic post was Philippine Ambassador to Sri Lanka. He was well loved by  the Filipino community there and reciprocated by serving his utmost best.

After retiring from the diplomatic corps, De la Rosa made his last foray into politics by unsuccessfully running in the 1984 Batasang Pambansa parliamentary election. Shortly before his death from a heart attack in 1986, he played one last acting role, in a guest spot on the popular drama anthology Coney Reyes on Camera.

De la Rosa was married twice. His second wife, Lota Delgado, was a former leading lady of his in films.
He was buried in Loyola Memorial Park in Marikina, beside his brother's grave.

Selected filmography

1930: 
1932: Ligaw na Bulaklak
1932: Tianak
1932: Ulong Inasnan
1933: Nahuling Pagsisisi
1933: Ang Ganid
1934: Sawing Palad
1934: Krus na Bato
1936: Buhok ni Ester
1936: Diwata ng Karagatan
1936: Kalupitan ng Tadhana
1936: Awit ng mga Ulila
1936: Anak-Dalita
1936: Lagablab ng Kabataan
1937: Anak ng Pari
1937: Magkapatid
1937: Teniente Rosario
1937: Bituing Marikit
1938: Mga Sugat ng Puso
1938: Makiling
1938: Bukang Liwayway
1938: Ang Magmamani - Luis
1938: Sanggumay
1938: Bahay-Kubo
1938: Diwata ng Karagatan
1939: Magkaisang Landas
1939: Lagot Na Kuwintas
1939: Pasang Krus
1939: Takip-Silim
1939: Inang Mahal
1939: Florante at Laura
1939: Dalisay
1939: Ang Magsasampaguita
1940: Lambingan
1940: Senorita
1940: Nang Mahawi ang Ulap
1940: Gunita
1940: Diwa ng Awit
1940: Colegiala
1940: Magbalik ka, Hirang
1940: Katarungan
1940: Estrellita
1941: Tampuhan
1941: Tarhata
1941: Panambitan
1941: Ang Maestra
1941: Serenata sa Nayon
1942: Caballero
1942: Anong Ganda Mo
1944: Perfidia
1946: Tagumpay
1946: Garrison 13
1946: Ang Prinsipeng Hindi Tumatawa
1946: Dalawang Daigdig
1946: Honeymoon
1946: Victory Joe
1946: Angelus
1947: Ang Lalaki
1947: Ang Himala ng Birhen sa Antipolo
1947: Sarung Banggi - Nanding
1947: Hagibis
1947: Backpay
1948: Ang Vengador
1948: Hampas ng Langit
1948: Sa Tokyo Ikinasal - Carlos
1948: Bulaklak at Paruparo
1949: Kampanang Ginto
1949: Bandilang Basahan
1949: Camelia
1949: Kidlat sa Silangan
1949: Ang Hiwaga ng Tulay na Bato
1949: Ang Lumang Bahay sa Gulod
1949: Milyonarya - Delfin Glorioso
1950: 48 Oras - Ricardo
1950: Doble Cara1950: Prinsipe Amante - Rodrigo
1950: Tigang na Lupa1950: Sohrab at Rustum1950: Ang Kampana ng San Diego1951: Bayan o Pag-ibig1951: Prinsipe Amante sa Rubitanya1951: Haring Cobra - Felipe / Haring Cobra
1952: Dimas: The Sainted Robber - Dimas
1952: Romansa sa Nayon1952: Babaeng hampaslupa1952: Irisan1953: Sa Paanan ng Bundok - Ric
1954: Maala-Ala Mo Kaya? - Celso
1954: Dakilang Pgpapakasakit - Roberto
1954: Jack & Jill - Gardo
1954: Ikaw ang Buhay Ko1954: Aristokrata1955: Ang Tangi kong Pag-ibig1955: El conde de Monte Carlo1955: Higit sa Lahat - Roberto
1955: Sonny Boy1955: Iyung-Iyo1955: Pandanggo ni Neneng1955: Artista1956: Lydia1956: Apat na Kasaysayang Ginto - (First segment -"Ngayon at Kailan Man")
1956: Babaing Mandarambong1956: Idolo1956: Pampanggenya1956: Gintong Pangarap1957: Veronica1957: Sino ang Maysala1961: Dugo at Luha'' - (final film role)

References

Sources

External links

Profile from the Official Website of the Philippine Senate
"Star Studded Politics" - Philippine Center for Investigative Journalism

1916 births
1986 deaths
Ambassadors of the Philippines to the Netherlands
Kapampangan people
People from San Nicolas, Manila
Senators of the 5th Congress of the Philippines
Senators of the 4th Congress of the Philippines
Candidates in the 1961 Philippine presidential election
Filipino people of Spanish descent
Filipino actor-politicians
Male actors from Pampanga
Liberal Party (Philippines) politicians
20th-century Filipino male actors
Far Eastern University alumni
Filipino politicians of Chinese descent
Filipino male film actors
Filipino male stage actors